Peiraikos Syndesmos (Greek: Πειραϊκός Σύνδεσμος) or simply Peiraikos, also written Piraikos Syndesmos, is one of the oldest sports clubs in Greece, based in Piraeus. It was founded in 1894. Today Peiraikos has departments in basketball, volleyball, and track and field. The previous years it had departments in football, swimming, handball, and water polo.

Active departments
Peiraikos B.C. Basketball team
Peiraikos V.C. Volleyball team
Peiraikos Track and Field team

History
Peiraikos was founded in 1894. The club was one of the founder members of SEGAS.  Peiraikos was the first club which founded a football team in Piraeus. It won a Panhellenic football championship in 1923 and the first Greek water polo championship. 

The basketball team of Peiraikos was founded in 1935. It has played two times in A1 Ethniki (first division), in the 1991-92 and 1996-97 seasons. The women's basketball team has won two championships, in 1969 and 1970. 

Peiraikos volleyball team was founded in 1929. It was the club that brought volleyball to the city of Piraeus. Today it  a women's volleyball team.

Honours

Peiraikos Football team (defunct)
Panhellenic Football Championship
Winner (1): 1923
Greek Cup
Winner (1): 1910

Peiraikos Basketball team (Women)
Greek Championship
Winner (2): 1969, 1970

Peiraikos Athletics team
Panhellenic championship (1): 1935

Peiraikos Warer polo team
Panhellenic championship (1): 1923

References

External links
 Official webpage

Sports clubs established in 1894
Multi-sport clubs in Piraeus